Infinitas is a 1992 Russian drama film directed by Marlen Khutsiev. It was entered into the 42nd Berlin International Film Festival where it won the Alfred Bauer Prize.

Plot
Reflecting on the meaning of life, the hero of the film involuntarily becomes a real participant of his own memories.

His traveling companion — he himself, 20 years ago, a young boy, not burdened by life experience, which is still to come, along with sins and virtues. The hero is like living over his life, trying to find his way back to basics, to learn of his roots.

Cast
  Vladislav Pilnikov 
  Aleksei Zelenov 
  Marina Khazova 
  Anna Tchernakova  (as Anna Kudryavtseva)
  Nina Pritolovskaya 
  Yuri Khlopetsky 
  Natalya Goncharova

References

External links

1992 films
1990s Russian-language films
1992 drama films
Films directed by Marlen Khutsiev

Mosfilm films
Russian drama films